Bad Emstal is a municipality in the district of Kassel, in Hesse, Germany. It is situated 19 km southwest of Kassel, Germany.

Demographics 
Bad Emstal is 20 km in the south-west of the main district city Kassel.  The commune is arounded of the national park Habichtswald.

Localities
Falkenstein Castle (Bad Emstal)

References

Kassel (district)
Spa towns in Germany